In enzymology, an indoleacetaldoxime dehydratase is an enzyme that catalyzes the chemical reaction

(indol-3-yl)acetaldehyde oxime  (indol-3-yl)acetonitrile + H2O

Hence, this enzyme has one substrate, (indol-3-yl)acetaldehyde oxime, and two products, (indol-3-yl)acetonitrile and H2O.

This enzyme belongs to the family of lyases, specifically the "catch-all" class of lyases that do not fit into any other sub-class.  The systematic name of this enzyme class is (indol-3-yl)acetaldehyde-oxime hydro-lyase [(indol-3-yl)acetonitrile-forming]. Other names in common use include indoleacetaldoxime hydro-lyase, 3-indoleacetaldoxime hydro-lyase, indole-3-acetaldoxime hydro-lyase, indole-3-acetaldehyde-oxime hydro-lyase, and (indol-3-yl)acetaldehyde-oxime hydro-lyase.  This enzyme participates in cyanoamino acid metabolism.

References

 
 

EC 4.99.1
Enzymes of unknown structure